This is a list of Hong Kong football transfers for the 2018 summer transfer window. Only moves featuring at least one Premier League club are listed.

The summer transfer window was open from 11 July 2018 to 2 October 2018.

Dreams 

In:

 
 
 
 

 

 

Out:

Eastern 

In:

 
 
 
 
 
 
 
 

Out:

Hoi King 

In:

  

 
 

 
 

 

 

 

 

Out:

Hong Kong Pegasus 

In:

 

 
 
 

Out:

Kitchee 

In:

 

 

 

Out:

Lee Man 

In:

 
 

 

 
 

Out:

Southern 

In:

 
 

 
 

Out:

R&F (Hong Kong) 

In:

 
 
 
 

 
 
 
 

Out:

Tai Po 

In:

 
 

Out:

Yuen Long 

In:

Out:

References 

2018
Transfers
Transfers
Hong Kong